The Legislative Assembly of Ceará is the unicameral legislature of Ceará state in Brazil. It has 46 state deputies elected by proportional representation.

The first legislature was in 1835 and had 28 deputies, the headquarters was in Palácio Senador Alencar during 106 years, now it's in Palácio Deputado Adauto Bezerra since 1977.

External links
Official website

Ceará
Ceara
Ceara